Synaphosus is a genus of ground spiders that was first described by Norman I. Platnick & M. U. Shadab in 1980.

Species
 it contains thirty-two species:
Synaphosus cangshanus Yang, Yang & Zhang, 2013 – China
Synaphosus daweiensis Yin, Bao & Peng, 2002 – China
Synaphosus dubius Marusik & Omelko, 2018 – Thailand
Synaphosus evertsi Ovtsharenko, Levy & Platnick, 1994 – Ivory Coast, Indonesia (Bali), Philippines
Synaphosus femininis Deeleman-Reinhold, 2001 – China, Laos, Indonesia (Java)
Synaphosus gracillimus (O. Pickard-Cambridge, 1872) – Egypt, Israel
Synaphosus intricatus (Denis, 1947) – Algeria, Egypt
Synaphosus iunctus Sankaran & Sebastian, 2018 – India
Synaphosus jaegeri Marusik & Omelko, 2018 – Laos
Synaphosus kakamega Ovtsharenko, Levy & Platnick, 1994 – Kenya
Synaphosus karakumensis Ovtsharenko, Levy & Platnick, 1994 – Turkmenistan
Synaphosus khashm Ovtsharenko, Levy & Platnick, 1994 – Saudi Arabia
Synaphosus lehtineni Marusik & Omelko, 2018 – Indonesia (Sulawesi)
Synaphosus makhambetensis Ponomarev, 2008 – Kazakhstan
Synaphosus minimus (Caporiacco, 1936) – Libya, Egypt
Synaphosus mongolicus Marusik & Fomichev, 2016 – Mongolia
Synaphosus nanus (O. Pickard-Cambridge, 1872) – Israel
Synaphosus neali Ovtsharenko, Levy & Platnick, 1994 – Iran, Pakistan
Synaphosus ovtsharenkoi Marusik & Fomichev, 2016 – Mongolia
Synaphosus palearcticus Ovtsharenko, Levy & Platnick, 1994 – Greece, Turkey to Central Asia
Synaphosus paludis (Chamberlin & Gertsch, 1940) – USA
Synaphosus raveni Deeleman-Reinhold, 2001 – Thailand
Synaphosus saidovi Marusik & Fomichev, 2016 – Tajikistan
Synaphosus sauvage Ovtsharenko, Levy & Platnick, 1994 – Spain, France, Switzerland, Italy
Synaphosus shirin Ovtsharenko, Levy & Platnick, 1994 – Cyprus, Iran
Synaphosus shmakovi Marusik & Fomichev, 2016 – Mongolia
Synaphosus soyunovi Ovtsharenko, Levy & Platnick, 1994 – Turkmenistan
Synaphosus syntheticus (Chamberlin, 1924) (type) – Libya, Egypt, Israel, Saudi Arabia. Introduced to USA, Mexico
Synaphosus taukum Ovtsharenko, Levy & Platnick, 1994 – Kazakhstan
Synaphosus trichopus (Roewer, 1928) – Greece, Crete
Synaphosus turanicus Ovtsharenko, Levy & Platnick, 1994 – Central Asia
Synaphosus yatenga Ovtsharenko, Levy & Platnick, 1994 – Burkina Faso

References

Araneomorphae genera
Gnaphosidae
Spiders of Africa
Spiders of Asia
Spiders of North America